In baseball, a home run is credited to a batter when he hits a fair ball and reaches home safely on the same play, without the benefit of an error.  133 players have hit a home run in their first at bat of a Major League Baseball (MLB) game to date, the most recent being Josh Jung of the Texas Rangers on September 9, 2022. George Tebeau and Mike Griffin both hit home runs in their first at bats on April 16, 1887.  Both players are recognized as the first player to homer in his first major league at bat because the exact time when each home run was hit is unclear.

Luke Stuart, Walter Mueller, and Johnnie LeMaster hit inside-the-park home runs in their first at bats. Bill Duggleby, Jeremy Hermida, Brandon Crawford, Kevin Kouzmanoff, and Daniel Nava hit grand slams; Kouzmanoff and Nava did so on the first pitch. Ernie Koy and Heinie Mueller were the first players to accomplish the feat in the same game, doing so for the Brooklyn Dodgers and Philadelphia Phillies, respectively, in the first inning of Opening Day in 1938.  This was equalled in 2016 by Tyler Austin and Aaron Judge, who became the only players to achieve the feat as teammates (playing for the New York Yankees) and in back-to-back at bats.  Two players, Bob Nieman and Keith McDonald, each homered in their second at bat as well. Paul Gillespie and John Miller are the only players to hit home runs in both their first and last major league at bats; for Miller these were the only two home runs of his MLB career.  For 23 players, their first at bat home run was the only home run of their major league careers.  On the other hand, Gary Gaetti hit more home runs (360) than any other player to hit one in their first at bat.

Of the 31 players eligible for the Baseball Hall of Fame who have hit a home run in their first major league at bat, two – Earl Averill and Hoyt Wilhelm – have been elected, neither of them on the first ballot.  Players are eligible for the Hall of Fame if they have played in at least 10 MLB seasons, and have either been retired for five seasons or deceased for at least six months.  These requirements leave 19 players ineligible who are active, 1 player (Mike Napoli) ineligible who is living and has played in the past five seasons, and 75 players ineligible who did not play in 10 seasons.

Players

{| class="wikitable sortable plainrowheaders" style="text-align:center;"
|+MLB hitters with a home run in their first major league at bat
!scope="col"|Player
!scope="col"|Date
!scope="col"|Team
!scope="col"|League
!scope="col"|Career HR
!scope="col" class="unsortable"|Box
!scope="col" class="unsortable"|Ref(s)
|-
!scope="row" style="text-align:center"|
|
|Cincinnati Red Stockings
|AA
|15
|
|
|-
!scope="row" style="text-align:center"|
|
|Baltimore Orioles
|AA
|42
|
|
|-
!scope="row" style="text-align:center"|
|
|Pittsburgh Alleghenys
|NL
|1
|
|
|-
!scope="row" style="text-align:center"|
|
|Boston Beaneaters
|NL
|3
|
|
|-
!scope="row" style="text-align:center"|
|
|Philadelphia Phillies
|NL
|6
|
|
|-
!scope="row" style="text-align:center"|
|
|Boston Beaneaters
|NL
|25
|
|
|-
!scope="row" style="text-align:center"|
|
|St. Louis Browns
|AL
|1
|
|
|-
!scope="row" style="text-align:center"|
|
|Pittsburgh Pirates
|NL
|2
|
|
|-
!scope="row" style="text-align:center; background:#ffb;"|
|
|Cleveland Indians
|AL
|238
|
|
|-
!scope="row" style="text-align:center"|
|
|Brooklyn Robins
|NL
|3
|
|
|-
!scope="row" style="text-align:center"|
|
|Brooklyn Robins
|NL
|8
|
|
|-
!scope="row" style="text-align:center"|
|
|St. Louis Cardinals
|NL
|1
|
|
|-
!scope="row" style="text-align:center"|
|
|Philadelphia Athletics
|AL
|2
|
|
|-
!scope="row" style="text-align:center"|
|
|Philadelphia Athletics
|AL
|4
|
|
|-
!scope="row" style="text-align:center"|
|style="background-color:#FFE6BD;"|
|Brooklyn Dodgers
|NL
|36
|
|
|-
!scope="row" style="text-align:center"|
|style="background-color:#FFE6BD;"|
|Philadelphia Phillies
|NL
|17
|
|
|-
!scope="row" style="text-align:center"|
|
|Boston Red Sox
|AL
|1
|
|
|-
!scope="row" style="text-align:center"|
|
|Cincinnati Reds
|NL
|69
|
|
|-
!scope="row" style="text-align:center"|
|
|Chicago Cubs
|NL
|6
|
|
|-
!scope="row" style="text-align:center"|
|
|New York Giants
|NL
|31
|
|
|-
!scope="row" style="text-align:center"|
|
|Detroit Tigers
|AL
|1
|
|
|-
!scope="row" style="text-align:center"|
|
|New York Giants
|NL
|114
|
|
|-
!scope="row" style="text-align:center"|
|
|Boston Red Sox
|AL
|20
|
|
|-
!scope="row" style="text-align:center"|
|
|Brooklyn Dodgers
|NL
|1
|
|
|-
!scope="row" style="text-align:center"|
|
|Detroit Tigers
|AL
|12
|
|
|-
!scope="row" style="text-align:center"|
|
|New York Giants
|NL
|2
|
|
|-
!scope="row" style="text-align:center"|
|
|Philadelphia Phillies
|NL
|3
|
|
|-
!scope="row" style="text-align:center"|
|
|Cincinnati Reds
|NL
|5
|
|
|-
!scope="row" style="text-align:center"|
|
|St. Louis Browns
|AL
|125
|
|
|-
!scope="row" style="text-align:center; background:#ffb;"|
|
|New York Giants
|NL
|1
|
|
|-
!scope="row" style="text-align:center"|
|
|St. Louis Cardinals
|NL
|142
|
|
|-
!scope="row" style="text-align:center"|
|
|Milwaukee Braves
|NL
|21
|
|
|-
!scope="row" style="text-align:center"|
|
|New York Giants
|NL
|202
|
|
|-
!scope="row" style="text-align:center"|
|
|Chicago Cubs
|NL
|2
|
|
|-
!scope="row" style="text-align:center"|
|
|Pittsburgh Pirates
|NL
|15
|
|
|-
!scope="row" style="text-align:center"|
|
|Chicago Cubs
|NL
|1
|
|
|-
!scope="row" style="text-align:center"|
|
|Boston Red Sox
|AL
|79
|
|
|-
!scope="row" style="text-align:center"|
|
|Washington Senators
|AL
|32
|
|
|-
!scope="row" style="text-align:center"|
|
|Baltimore Orioles
|AL
|3
|
|
|-
!scope="row" style="text-align:center"|
|
|Detroit Tigers
|AL
|84
|
|
|-
!scope="row" style="text-align:center"|
|
|Kansas City Athletics
|AL
|79
|
|
|-
!scope="row" style="text-align:center"|
|
|Detroit Tigers
|AL
|1
|
|
|-
!scope="row" style="text-align:center"|
|
|Washington Senators
|AL
|38
|
|
|-
!scope="row" style="text-align:center"|
|
|New York Yankees
|AL
|2
|
|
|-
!scope="row" style="text-align:center"|
|
|Minnesota Twins
|AL
|20
|
|
|-
!scope="row" style="text-align:center"|
|
|Oakland Athletics
|AL
|9
|
|
|-
!scope="row" style="text-align:center"|
|
|Detroit Tigers
|AL
|4
|
|
|-
!scope="row" style="text-align:center"|
|
|California Angels
|AL
|1
|
|
|-
!scope="row" style="text-align:center"|
|
|New York Mets
|NL
|38
|
|
|-
!scope="row" style="text-align:center"|
|
|Detroit Tigers
|AL
|3
|
|
|-
!scope="row" style="text-align:center"|
|
|San Francisco Giants
|NL
|4
|
|
|-
!scope="row" style="text-align:center"|
|
|Houston Astros
|NL{{refn|The Houston Astros were part of the National League until the 2012 season, after which they moved to the American League.<ref> </ref>|name=Houston|group=upper-alpha}}
|1
|
|
|-
!scope="row" style="text-align:center"|
|
|Minnesota Twins
|AL
|21
|
|
|-
!scope="row" style="text-align:center"|
|
|San Francisco Giants
|NL
|22
|
|
|-
!scope="row" style="text-align:center"|
|
|Toronto Blue Jays
|AL
|35
|
|
|-
!scope="row" style="text-align:center"|
|
|California Angels
|AL
|1
|
|
|-
!scope="row" style="text-align:center"|
|
|Montreal Expos
|NL
|260
|
|
|-
!scope="row" style="text-align:center"|
|
|Minnesota Twins
|AL
|360
|
|
|-
!scope="row" style="text-align:center"|
|
|Chicago Cubs
|NL
|108
|
|
|-
!scope="row" style="text-align:center"|
|
|New York Mets
|NL
|48
|
|
|-
!scope="row" style="text-align:center"|
|
|Minnesota Twins
|AL
|1
|
|
|-
!scope="row" style="text-align:center"|
|
|San Francisco Giants
|NL
|284
|
|
|-
!scope="row" style="text-align:center"|
|
|Oakland Athletics
|AL
|162
|
|
|-
!scope="row" style="text-align:center"|
|
|Cleveland Indians
|AL
|195
|
|
|-
!scope="row" style="text-align:center"|
|
|Philadelphia Phillies
|NL
|55
|
|
|-
!scope="row" style="text-align:center"|
|
|Toronto Blue Jays
|AL
|55
|
|
|-
!scope="row" style="text-align:center"|
|
|Los Angeles Dodgers
|NL
|57
|
|
|-
!scope="row" style="text-align:center"|
|
|San Diego Padres
|NL
|1
|
|
|-
!scope="row" style="text-align:center"|
|
|Chicago Cubs
|NL
|4
|
|
|-
!scope="row" style="text-align:center"|
|
|Colorado Rockies
|NL
|3
|
|
|-
!scope="row" style="text-align:center"|
|
|Florida Marlins
|NL
|1
|
|
|-
!scope="row" style="text-align:center"|
|
|Los Angeles Dodgers
|NL
|3
|
|
|-
!scope="row" style="text-align:center"|
|
|Kansas City Royals
|AL
|42
|
|
|-
!scope="row" style="text-align:center"|
|
|Atlanta Braves
|NL
|325
|
|
|-
!scope="row" style="text-align:center"|
|
|Montreal Expos
|NL
|2
|
|
|-
!scope="row" style="text-align:center"|
|
|Montreal Expos
|NL
|114
|
|
|-
!scope="row" style="text-align:center"|
|
|Philadelphia Phillies
|NL
|63
|
|
|-
!scope="row" style="text-align:center"|
|
|Chicago White Sox
|AL
|358
|
|
|-
!scope="row" style="text-align:center"|
|
|Montreal Expos
|NL
|2
|
|
|-
!scope="row" style="text-align:center"|
|
|Tampa Bay Devil Rays
|AL
|1
|
|
|-
!scope="row" style="text-align:center"|
|
|Arizona Diamondbacks
|NL
|5
|
|
|-
!scope="row" style="text-align:center"|
|
|St. Louis Cardinals
|NL
|3
|
|
|-
!scope="row" style="text-align:center"|
|
|St. Louis Cardinals
|NL
|34
|
|
|-
!scope="row" style="text-align:center"|
|
|St. Louis Cardinals
|NL
|1
|
|
|-
!scope="row" style="text-align:center"|
|
|New York Yankees
|AL
|115
|
|
|-
!scope="row" style="text-align:center"|
|
|Chicago White Sox
|AL
|145
|
|
|-
!scope="row" style="text-align:center"|
|
|Houston Astros
|NL
|1
|
|
|-
!scope="row" style="text-align:center"|
|
|New York Mets
|NL
|32
|
|
|-
!scope="row" style="text-align:center"|
|
|St. Louis Cardinals
|NL
|15
|
|
|-
!scope="row" style="text-align:center"|
|
|Seattle Mariners
|AL
|46
|
|
|-
!scope="row" style="text-align:center"|
|
|New York Yankees
|AL
|14
|
|
|-
!scope="row" style="text-align:center"|
|
|New York Mets
|NL
|100
|
|
|-
!scope="row" style="text-align:center"|
|
|Florida Marlins
|NL
|65
|
|
|-
!scope="row" style="text-align:center"|
|
|Los Angeles Angels
|AL
|267
|
|
|-
!scope="row" style="text-align:center; background:#cfecec;"|
|
|St. Louis Cardinals
|NL
|10
|
|
|-
!scope="row" style="text-align:center"|
|
|Cleveland Indians
|AL
|87
|
|
|-
!scope="row" style="text-align:center"|
|
|Houston Astros
|NL
|2
|
|
|-
!scope="row" style="text-align:center"|
|
|Chicago White Sox
|AL
|34
|
|
|-
!scope="row" style="text-align:center"|
|
|Tampa Bay Devil Rays
|AL
|31
|
|
|-
!scope="row" style="text-align:center"|
|
|St. Louis Cardinals
|NL
|1
|
|
|-
!scope="row" style="text-align:center"|
|
|Baltimore Orioles
|AL
|5
|
|
|-
!scope="row" style="text-align:center"|
|
|Houston Astros
|NL
|1
|
|
|-
!scope="row" style="text-align:center"|
|
|Atlanta Braves
|NL
|12
|
|
|-
!scope="row" style="text-align:center"|
|
|Arizona Diamondbacks
|NL
|90
|
|
|-
!scope="row" style="text-align:center"|
|
|Arizona Diamondbacks
|NL
|6
|
|
|-
!scope="row" style="text-align:center; background:#cfecec;"|
|
|Atlanta Braves
|NL
|159
|
|
|-
!scope="row" style="text-align:center"|
|
|Minnesota Twins
|AL
|8
|
|
|-
!scope="row" style="text-align:center; background:#cfecec;"|
|
|Chicago Cubs
|NL
|138
|
|
|-
!scope="row" style="text-align:center;"|
|
|Boston Red Sox
|AL
|29
|
|
|-
!scope="row" style="text-align:center"|
|
|Toronto Blue Jays
|AL
|80
|
|
|-
!scope="row" style="text-align:center;|
|
|Tampa Bay Rays
|AL
|32
|
|
|-
!scope="row" style="text-align:center; background:#cfecec;"|
|
|Washington Nationals
|NL
|1
|
|
|-
!scope="row" style="text-align:center"|
|
|San Francisco Giants
|NL
|9
|
|
|-
!scope="row" style="text-align:center; background:#cfecec;"|
|
|Pittsburgh Pirates
|NL
|142
|
|
|-
!scope="row" style="text-align:center"|
|
|San Diego Padres
|NL
|1
|
|
|-
!scope="row" style="text-align:center; background:#cfecec;"|
|
|Texas Rangers
|AL
|78
|
|
|-
!scope="row" style="text-align:center; background:#cfecec;"|
|
|Chicago Cubs
|NL
|134
|
|
|-
!scope="row" style="text-align:center; background:#cfecec;"|
|
|Minnesota Twins
|AL
|138
|
|
|-
!scope="row" style="text-align:center; background:#cfecec;"|
|
|Detroit Tigers
|AL
|1
|
|
|-
!scope="row" style="text-align:center; background:#cfecec;"|
|
|Chicago Cubs
|NL
|116
|
|
|-
!scope="row" style="text-align:center; background:#cfecec;"|
|style="background-color:#FFE6BD;"|
|New York Yankees
|AL
|33
|
|
|-
!scope="row" style="text-align:center; background:#cfecec;"|
|style="background-color:#FFE6BD;"|
|New York Yankees
|AL
|218
|
|
|-
!scope="row" style="text-align:center; background:#cfecec;"|
|
|St. Louis Cardinals
|NL
|102
|
|
|-
!scope="row" style="text-align:center; background:#cfecec;"|
|
|St. Louis Cardinals
|NL
|29
|
|
|-
!scope="row" style="text-align:center; background:#cfecec;"|
|
|Chicago White Sox
|AL
|11
|
|
|-
!scope="row" style="text-align:center; background:#cfecec;"|
|
|Cincinnati Reds
|NL
|18
|
|
|-
!scope="row" style="text-align:center; background:#cfecec;"|
|
|Los Angeles Dodgers
|NL
|11
|
|
|-
!scope="row" style="text-align:center; background:#cfecec;"|
|
|Detroit Tigers
|AL
|11
|
|
|-
!scope="row" style="text-align:center; background:#cfecec;"|
|
|Detroit Tigers
|AL
|15
|
|
|-
!scope="row" style="text-align:center; background:#cfecec;"|
|
|Arizona Diamondbacks
|NL
|2
|
|
|-
!scope="row" style="text-align:center; background:#cfecec;"|
|
|Miami Marlins
|NL
|1
|
|
|-
!scope="row" style="text-align:center; background:#cfecec;"|
|
|Chicago Cubs
|NL
|14
|
|
|-
!scope="row" style="text-align:center; background:#cfecec;"|
|
|Los Angeles Dodgers
|NL
|1
|
|
|-
!scope="row" style="text-align:center; background:#cfecec;"|
|
|New York Mets
|NL
|2
|
|
|-
!scope="row" style="text-align:center; background:#cfecec;"|
|
|Cincinnati Reds
|NL
|1
|
|
|-
!scope="row" style="text-align:center; background:#cfecec;"|
|
|Texas Rangers
|AL
|3
|
|
|}

See also

List of Major League Baseball players with a home run in their final major league at bat

Notes

ReferencesGeneral 
 

 Specific'''

Home run o
Major League Baseball statistics